Grabovac may refer to:

Places
 Grabovac, Osijek-Baranja County, a village in eastern Croatia
 Grabovac Banski, a village in central Croatia
 Grabovac, Split-Dalmatia County, a village near Šestanovac in southern Croatia
 Grabovac, Karlovac County, a village near Rakovica in central Croatia
 Stari Grabovac, Sisak-Moslavina County, (Old Grabovac), a village near Novska and site of a Nazi concentration camp
 Grabovac (Knić), a village in Serbia
 Grabovac (Obrenovac), a village in Serbia
 Grabovac (Prokuplje), a village in Serbia
 Grabovac (Svilajnac), a village in Serbia
 Grabovac (Trstenik), a village in Serbia
 Grabovac (Čelinac), a village in Republika Srpska, Bosnia and Herzegovina
 Grabovac, Velika Kladuša, a village near Velika Kladuša in Bosnia and Herzegovina
 Grabovac, Bosnia and Herzegovina, a village near Ljubinje
 Grabovac Monastery, a Serbian Orthodox monastery
 , a village in Kosovo

People
Filip Grabovac (1698–1749), Croatian priest
Mirko Grabovac (born 1971), Croatian-Singaporean football player
Nikolina Grabovac (born 1968), former Croatian and Yugoslav female professional basketball player
Žarko Grabovač (born 1983), Serbian-Dutch football player

See also
 Grabovica (disambiguation)